Kilcolman Bog is a national nature reserve of approximately  in County Cork.

Features
Kilcolman Bog was legally protected as a national nature reserve by the Irish government in 1993. Most of the reserve, is privately owned, with a small part in state ownership . It is also a Special Protection Area.

Kilcolman Bog is a fen and is located south of the Ballyhoura Mountains. It formed in a limestone hollow which was eroded by glaciers. Greenland white fronted geese and thousands of duck overwinter in the reserve. There is also an abundance of flora which are unique or rare to County Cork.

There are bird hides and boardwalks on the reserve. In 2017, Birdwatch Ireland took ownership of the private parts of the reserve from the previous owners, Richard and Margaret Ridgway.

References

Bogs of the Republic of Ireland
Landforms of County Cork
Protected areas of County Cork
Tourist attractions in County Cork
Nature reserves in the Republic of Ireland
Protected areas established in 1993
1993 establishments in Ireland